The 1996–97 Iowa State Cyclones men's basketball team represented Iowa State University during the 1996–97 NCAA Division I men's basketball season. The Cyclones were coached by Tim Floyd, who was in his 3rd season. They played their home games at Hilton Coliseum in Ames, Iowa and is an original member of the newly created Big 12 Conference. The Big 12 conference was formed by the eight teams of the recently dissolved Big Eight Conference and was joined by Baylor, Texas, Texas A&M, and Texas Tech, all formally of the Southwest Conference which had also dissolved following the 1995–1996 school year.

They finished the season 22–9 and 10–6 in conference play to finish tied for third place.  They defeated Texas Tech and lost to Kansas in the semifinals of the Big 12 Conference tournament.  They received an at-large bid to the NCAA tournament where they defeated Illinois State and Cincinnati to reach the Sweet Sixteen where they lost to UCLA in overtime.

Previous season
The previous season the Cyclones finished the season 24–9, 9–5 in Big Eight play to finish in 2nd place.  They defeated Nebraska, Missouri, and #5 Kansas to win the 1996 Big Eight conference tournament championship.  This was Iowa State's first conference championship in program history.  The conference championship earned them a bid to the NCAA tournament and a #5 seed.   In the tournament they defeated Cal and lost to Utah in the round of 32.

It was the Cyclones final season in the Big Eight Conference, which dissolved at the end of the 1995–1996 school year.

The Cyclones saw individual success with Dedric Willoughby being names All-American honorable mention, first team All-Big Eight, and Big Eight tournament MVP.  Tim Floyd was named Big Eight Coach of the Year and was runner up for AP Coach of the Year.

Presesaon

Preseason poll

Incoming players

Roster

Schedule and results

|-
!colspan=12 style=""|Exhibition

|-

|-
!colspan=12 style=""|Regular Season

|-

|-

|-

|-

|-

|-

|-

|-

|-

|-

|-

|-

|-

|-

|-

|-

|-

|-

|-

|-

|-

|-

|-

|-

|-

|-
!colspan=12 style=""|Big 12 Tournament

|-

|-
!colspan=12 style=""|NCAA Tournament

|-

|-

|-

Rankings

During weeks eight and nine of the regular season the Cyclones were ranked #4 in the AP Poll.  This was the highest ranking the Cyclones had reached since the 1956–57 season when they were ranked #3.  This was also the first time in school history the Cyclones were ranked in the top 25 of both the AP and Coaches Poll every week of the season.

Awards and honors

All-Americans

Dedric Willoughby (2nd Team)

NCAA Tournament All-Regional Team

Dedric Willoughby

Ralph A. Olsen Award

Dedric Willoughby

All-Big 12 Selections

Dedric Willoughby (First Team)
Kelvin Cato (Third Team)
Kenny Pratt (Third Team)

 Academic All-Big 12

Ha-Keem Abdel-Khaliq (First Team)
Klay Edwards (First Team)
Jason Teeter (First Team)
Paul Shirley (Second Team)
Tony Rampton (Second Team)
Stevie Johnson (Second Team)
Matthew Knoll (Second Team)

References

Iowa State Cyclones men's basketball seasons
Iowa State
Iowa State
Iowa State Cyc
Iowa State Cyc